Klaus-Peter Thaler (born 14 May 1949 in Eckmannshausen, North Rhine-Westphalia) is a former professional cyclist whose career spanned from 1976 to 1988, he was successful in road-racing and cyclo-cross. He was world cyclo-cross champion twice as amateur and twice as professional and German champion eight times.

Biography
Thaler studied at the University of Siegen.
In 1976, Thaler entered the Olympic Games, in the road race. He finished in ninth place. He turned professional one year later.

In the 1978 Tour de France, Thaler led the race for two days, after his team won the team time trial.

Thaler organises the Tour of Hope bicycle charity ride, and was given the Pierre de Coubertin medal for that in 2005.

Career achievements

Major results
Source:
 World Champion Cyclo-cross: 1985,1987
 German champion cyclo-cross: 1976,1977,1978,1979,1982,1986,1987,1988
 German cycling road champion for amateurs: 1976
 Vuelta a Andalucía 1977: Stage 1B
 Critérium du Dauphiné Libéré 1979: Stage 1
 Paris–Nice 1980: Stage 5

Tour de France results
Source:
 1977 Tour de France: did not finish, won stage 9
 1978 Tour de France: 35th place, won stage 3, wore the yellow jersey for 2 days
 1979 Tour de France: 37th place
 1980 Tour de France: 49th place
 1981 Tour de France: 90th place

References

1949 births
Living people
People from Siegen-Wittgenstein
Sportspeople from Arnsberg (region)
German male cyclists
Cyclo-cross cyclists
German Tour de France stage winners
Recipients of the Cross of the Order of Merit of the Federal Republic of Germany
University of Siegen alumni
UCI Cyclo-cross World Champions (men)
Cyclists from North Rhine-Westphalia
Olympic cyclists of West Germany
Cyclists at the 1976 Summer Olympics
German Vuelta a España stage winners